Juan Manuel Tafernaberry is an Uruguayan rugby union player, currently playing for Súper Liga Americana de Rugby side Peñarol. His preferred position is scrum-half.

Professional career
Tafernaberry signed for Súper Liga Americana de Rugby side Peñarol ahead of the 2022 Súper Liga Americana de Rugby season. He was previously a member of the  Academy side. He has also represented the Uruguay national team.

References

Living people
Uruguayan rugby union players
Rugby union scrum-halves
Stade Français players
Peñarol Rugby players
Year of birth missing (living people)